The Florence Nightingale Foundation (FNF) is a charity organisation in the United Kingdom that provides scholarships to nurses, midwives, and other health professionals while serving as a living memorial of the work of Florence Nightingale.

History
In 1912, a memorial to Florence Nightingale was first proposed by Mrs. Ethel Bedford-Fenwick at an International Council of Nurses Congress in Cologne. The intention was to create a foundation to provide educational support for nurses. 

The memorial proposal was activated at the ICN Grand Council in Montreal, delayed to 1929 due to World War I. In 1931, the Florence Nightingale Memorial Committee proposed that the Memorial Foundation for Florence Nightingale should focus on the post-graduate education of nurses. In 1934, the Florence Nightingale Foundation developed as an independent foundation based upon the same principles as the Memorial Committee and the Florence Nightingale International Foundation. The Florence Nightingale Foundation has since worked to be a living memorial to her life by providing scholarships to post-graduate nurses, midwives, and other health professionals in the United Kingdom. In 2022, the University of Derby became the first higher education institution to join the foundation academy.

Current State
The Foundation works to improve patient care in the UK by extending scholars' skills and knowledge and promoting innovation in practice. It achieves this through educational programs, leadership development, and clinical nursing research involvement including the development of the Florence Nightingale Foundation Chairs in Clinical Nursing Practice Research.

Scholarships
The Foundation’s scholarships are designed to enhance the contribution of nursing and midwifery to society by promoting innovation in practice and improving patient care.

The Foundation has three categories of scholarships:
 Travel scholarships are designed to enable a scholar to undertake the study of an aspect of practice and/or education in the UK or overseas.
 Research scholarships are provided to allow Nurses and Midwives to undertake a course in research methods, research modules, or a dissertation/thesis as part of an academic course of study.
 Leadership scholarships are for experienced Nurses and Midwives, Healthcare Deans, and Heads of Allied Health Professions.

Events and Activities
The Florence Nightingale Foundation hosts several events throughout the year.

Florence Nightingale Foundation Nightingale2020 Conference
Florence Nightingale Foundation, Burdett Trust and Dods partnered to organize the Nightingale2020 Conference to mark the 200th birthday of Florence Nightingale. The conference took place on 27–28 October 2020, at ExceL London.

Conference Theme History
 2011 – In the Footsteps of Florence – Sharing Innovation, Delivering the Solutions
 2012 – Sharing Innovation, Delivering the Solutions
 2013 – Going for Gold: Inspirational Practice and Excellence in Care 
 2014 – Be Inspired, Be Energized, Be Motivated
 2015 – What Good Looks Like: Leading Quality Care
 2016 – Branching Out from Solid Roots
 2017 – In It Together: Connections, Networks and Alliances

Florence Nightingale Commemoration Service – Westminster Abbey
A Commemoration Service is held in May of each year to celebrate Florence Nightingale. The service honors Florence on her birthday, May 12, and celebrates International Nurses Day.

Central to the service is the Lamp which was given to the Foundation by Sir Dan Mason OBE in 1968 in memory of his mother Kathleen Dampier-Bennett, a trustee and supporter of the Foundation. The Lamp is kept in the Florence Nightingale Chapel in Westminster Abbey. During the ceremony, several processions take place. Scholars of the Foundation process the Lamp to signify the knowledge of nursing and are escorted by student nurses, signifying the transfer of knowledge to future generations. The Chelsea Pensioners process in memory of Florence Nightingale for her care of the troops during the Crimean Campaign. The final procession is for the Nurses’ Roll of Honour which was compiled by the British Commonwealth Nurses War Memorial Fund and is also kept in the Florence Nightingale Chapel in the Abbey. It is carried out to honour those killed in the conflict and to underpin the links with military nursing and nurses who have lost their lives in the service of others.

Students Day
Students Day is an annual event in which students from each University in the UK, that has a School of Nursing and Midwifery, are invited to spend the day at the Foundation in London. The main venue for the day is The Governors Hall at St. Thomas Hospital. The event includes a morning plenary discussion session in which students are invited to raise questions or concerns with a panel of senior nurses where they engage in a professional debate, a tour of the Florence Nightingale Museum, a visit to the Florence Nightingale Chapel in Westminster Abbey, and attendance at the Annual Florence Nightingale Commemoration Service.

Presentation of Certificates
The Florence Nightingale Foundation Presentation of Certificates is held bi-annually and acts as the graduation ceremony for completed scholars. The event is an opportunity to celebrate the impact scholars have had on patient care and services.

In 2014, the Foundation’s Patron Sir Robert Francis, was the keynote speaker and described Florence Nightingale scholars as the ‘future leaders of the profession’.

Alumni Community
In 2019, Florence Nightingale Foundation launched the Alumni Community to allow members to remain connected to the work of the Foundation, engage with other scholars, share their ideas, knowledge, and expertise, and give something back, by raising funds and getting involved in mentoring current scholars.

References

Nursing organisations in the United Kingdom
Health charities in the United Kingdom